The  Jolof Empire, also known as the Wolof or Wollof Empire, was a West African state that ruled parts of modern-day Senegal from 1350 to 1549. Following the 1549 battle of Danki, its vassal states were fully or de facto independent; in this period it is known as the Jolof Kingdom.

Origins
Traditional accounts among the Wolof agree that the founder of the state and later empire was the possibly mythical Ndiadiane Ndiaye (also spelled Njaajaan Njaay). Traditional stories of the ancestry of this leader vary. According to James Searing, the myth says that he was "the first and only son of a noble and saintly “Arab” father Abdu Darday and a “Tukuler” woman, Fatamatu Sall." This gave him an Almoravid Islamic lineage and a link on his mother's side to Takrur. James Searing adds that "In all versions of the myth, Njaajaan Njaay speaks his first words in Pulaar rather than Wolof, emphasizing once again his character as a stranger of noble origins."
On his origin, Sallah writes: "Some say that Njajan was the son of Abu Darday, an Almoravid conqueror who came from Mecca to preach Islam in Senegal...Some say that Njajan Njai was a mysterious person of Fulani origin. Others say he was a Serer prince."

It has been suggested that the foundations of the empire were set down by the voluntary association of several small states beginning with Waalo in the north and that just prior to the empire's formation, Waalo was divided into villages ruled by separate kings using the Serer title Lamane.

Ndiadiane was born Ahmad Abu Bakr, also called Ahmadu Abubakar. The legend of Ndiadiane Ndiaye begins with a dispute over wood near a prominent lake. This almost led to bloodshed among the rulers but was stopped by the mysterious appearance of a stranger from the lake. The stranger divided the wood fairly and disappeared, leaving the people in awe. The people then feigned a second dispute and kidnapped the stranger when he returned. They offered him the kingship of their land and convinced him to do so and become mortal by offering him a beautiful woman to marry. When these events were reported to the ruler of the Sine, also a great magician, he is reported to have exclaimed "Ndiadiane Ndiaye" in his native Serer language in amazement. The ruler of the Kingdom of Sine (Maad a Sinig Maysa Wali) then suggested all rulers between the Senegal River and the Gambia River voluntarily submit to this man, which they did.

Fearing writes that "Most versions of the myth explain how the new dynasty superimposed itself upon a preexisting social structure dominated by the Laman, Wolof elders who claimed "ownership" of the land as the descendants of the founders of village communities. The laman retained many of their functions under the new monarchical order, becoming a kind of lesser nobility within the new state, and serving as electors when the time came to choose a new king from the Njaay dynasty."

John Donnelly Fage suggests, however, dates in the early 13th century (and others say the 12th century) are usually ascribed to this king and the founding of the empire, a more likely scenario is "that the rise of the empire was associated with the growth of Wolof power at the expense of the ancient Sudanese state of Takrur, and that this was essentially a fourteenth-century development."

History

Early history

The new state of Djolof, named for the central province where the king resided, was a vassal of the Mali Empire for much of its early history. Djolof remained within that empire's sphere of influence until the latter half of the 14th century. During a succession dispute in 1360 between two rival lineages within the Mali Empire's royal bloodline, the Jolof became permanently independent. A close examination of Jolof's societal and political structure reveals that at least some of its institutions may have been borrowed directly or developed alongside those of its larger predecessor.

Contact with Europe
After an initially hostile start, peaceful trade relations were established between the Jolof Empire and the kingdom of Portugal. At this time, Jolof was at the height of its power, and the Bur had extended his authority over the Malinke states on the northern bank of the Gambia, including Nyumi, Badibu, Nyani, and Wuli. In the 1480s, Prince Bemoi was ruling the empire in the name of his brother Bur Birao. Tempted by the Portuguese trade, he moved the seat of government to the coast to take advantage of the new economic opportunities. Other princes, opposed to this policy, deposed and murdered the bur in 1489. Prince Bemoi escaped and sought refuge with the Portuguese, who took him to Lisbon. There he exchanged gifts with King John II and was baptized. Faced with the opportunity to put a Christian ally on the throne, John II sent an expeditionary force under a Portuguese commander to put the prince back on the throne of Jolof. The objective was to put Bemoi on the throne and a fort at the mouth of the Senegal River. Neither goal was achieved. A dispute between the commander and the prince resulted in the former accusing Bemoi of treachery and killing him.

Late period
Despite internal feuds, the Jolof Empire remained a force to be reckoned with within the region. In the early 16th century, it was capable of fielding 100,000 infantry and 10,000 cavalry. But the seeds of the empire's destruction had already been sown by the prospects of Atlantic trade. Virtually everything that had given rise to the great Jolof Empire was now tearing it apart. Coastal trade, for instance, had brought extra wealth to the empire. But the rulers of the vassal states on the coast got the lion's share of the benefits, which eventually allowed them to eclipse and undermine what little power the emperor had. There was also the matter of external forces, such as the breakup of the Mali Empire. Mali's slipping grip on its far-flung empire, thanks to the growth of the Songhai Empire, had allowed Jolof to become an empire itself. But now conflicts in the north were spreading to Jolof's northern territories. In 1513, Dengella Koli led a strong force of Fulani and Mandinka into Futa Toro, seizing it from the Jolof and setting up his dynasty. Koli was the son of an unsuccessful rebellion against the Songhai Empire and may have decided to act against the Jolof as an alternative to fighting the Songhai or Mandinka.

Battle of Danki and Disintegration
In 1549, Kayor successfully broke from the Jolof Empire under the leadership of the crown prince Amari Ngoone Sobel Fall. The breakaway state of Cayor used its direct access to European trade (Jolof was landlocked and had no port) to grow in wealth and power. Kayor invaded its southern neighbor, Bawol, and began forming a personal union of its own. It defeated its overlord at the Battle of Danki in 1549. The battle caused a ripple effect resulting in other states leaving the empire. By 1600, the Jolof Empire was effectively over. Jolof was reduced to a kingdom; nevertheless, the title of Burba remained associated with imperial prestige and commanded nominal respect from its ancient vassals.

Society in Imperial Jolof
The Portuguese arrived in the Jolof Empire between 1444 and 1510, leaving detailed accounts of a very advanced political system. There was a developed hierarchical system involving different classes of royal and non-royal nobles, free men, occupational castes, and slaves. Occupational castes included blacksmiths, jewelers, tanners, tailors, musicians, and griots. Smiths were important to the society for their ability to make weapons of war as well as their trusted status for mediating disputes fairly. Griots were employed by every important family as chroniclers and advisors, without whom much of early Jolof history would be unknown. Jolof's nobility were nominally animists, but some combined this with Islam. However, Islam had not dominated Wolof society until about the 19th century, when the empire had long been reduced to a rump state in the form of the Kingdom of Jolof.

Women in Imperial Jolof
Throughout the different classes, intermarriage was rarely allowed. Women could not marry upwards, and their children did not inherit the father's superior status. However, women had some influence and role in government. The Linger or Queen Mother was head of all women and very influential in state politics. She owned several villages that cultivated farms and paid tribute directly to her. There were also other female chiefs whose main task was judging cases involving women. In the empire's most northern state of Walo, women could aspire to the office of Bur and rule the state.

Political organization
The Jolof Empire was organized as five coastal kingdoms from north to south, which included Waalo, Kayor, Baol, Sine and Kingdom of Saloum. All of these states were tributary to the land-locked state of Jolof. The ruler of Jolof was known as the Bour ba, and ruled from the capital of Linguère. Each Wolof state was governed by its ruler appointed from the descendants of the founder of the state. State rulers were chosen by their respective nobles, while the Bour was selected by a college of electors which also included the rulers of the five kingdoms. There was the Bour of Waalo, the Damel of Kayor, the Teny (or Teigne) of Baol, as well as the two Lamanes of the Serer states of Sine and Saloum. Each ruler had practical autonomy but was expected to cooperate with the Bour on matters of defense, trade, and provision of imperial revenue. Once appointed, officeholders went through elaborate rituals to both familiarize themselves with their new duties and elevate them to a divine status. From then on, they were expected to lead their states to greatness or risk being declared unfavored by the gods and being deposed. The stresses of this political structure resulted in a very autocratic government where personal armies and wealth often superseded constitutional values.

Serer tradition says that the Kingdom of Sine never paid tribute to Ndiadiane Ndiaye nor any his descendants at Jolof. It further states that the Sine was never subjugated by Jolof and that the probably mythical Ndiadiane himself received his name from the mouth of Maysa Wali (king of Sine).

Sylviane Diouf states that "Each vassal kingdom—Walo, Takrur, Kayor, Baol, Sine, Salum, Wuli, and Niani—recognized the hegemony of Jolof and paid tribute."

See also

Constituent parts of the Jolof Empire, roughly going north to south:
Waalo, Cayor, Baol, Sine, Saloum
Ethnic groups of the Jolof Empire:
Serer people
Wolof people
History of the Gambia
History of Senegal
The Kingdom of Jolof, which succeeded the Jolof Empire
List of rulers of Jolof
Mali Empire

References

Sources

States and territories established in 1350
Former empires in Africa
French West Africa
History of Senegal
Countries in medieval Africa
Countries in precolonial Africa
14th-century establishments in Africa
1549 disestablishments in Africa
 Sahelian kingdoms